Puthuppally is a village in Alappuzha district (in Kayamkulam) in the Indian state of Kerala.It is just 3 km away from the Kayamkulam town. Vadakke Anjilimoodu is the main junction.

Puthuppally village is a part of Devikulangara Gramapanchayath. Here, Prawn Industry is a main occupation for the people in the banks of Kayamkulam Lake. Coconut plantations of private landowners can be seen here. A lot of Paddy fields are here without any agriculture.

Demographics
As of 2001 Indian Census, Puthuppally (Village) had a population of 20758 with 9702 males and 11056 females.

Temples
 Devikulangara Devi Kshethram (Grama Devi / Village Temple)
 Vellisseril Devi Kshethram
 Varanappally Family Temple
 Idamarathusseril Shiva Kshethram 
 Kunnayyathu Devi Kshethram (Trust Administration)
 Kaniyamuri Devi Kshethram 
 Sree Dharmmasastha Kshethram 
 Kaleekasseril Devi Kshethram 
 Padinjattathil Devi Kshethram 
 Irisseril Devi Kshethram 
 Pathesseril Devi Temple 
 
 Choonatt Kaavu & Devi Temple
 
 Varambel Sree Durga Devi Kshethram, Kinarumukku
 
 Kumpalathu Padeetathil Sree Durga Yogeeswara Temple

Festivals

 Maha Shivarathri Mahotsvam 
 Ganeshotsvam (Coordinated by Sreeshylam Trust)
 Devikulangara Aswathy Maholsavam (On the month of Meenam)

 Kaleekkasheril Kettukazcha
 Kaleekkasheril Thattepechu
 Thirumudi Ezhunnullathu
 28 Onam Maholsavam
 Varanapally Pathiseril Temple - Peral Manikettu

Attractions

 Back Waters
 Coconut Plantations
 Prawn Industry

References

Villages in Alappuzha district